César Augusto Grajales Calle (born 6 May 1973) is a Colombian former professional road cyclist.

Major results
2004
 2nd Overall Redlands Bicycle Classic
 6th Overall Tour of Georgia
1st Stage 4
2005
 4th Overall Tour de Langkawi
2006
 1st Overall Edgar Soto Memorial
1st Stage 1
 4th Overall Tour de Langkawi
 10th Overall Tour of Georgia
2007
 1st Stage 3 San Dimas Stage Race
2010
 1st Stage 6 Tour of Atlanta
 9th Overall Tour of Utah
2011
 1st Stages 1 & 3 Cascade Cycling Classic

References

External links

1973 births
Living people
Colombian male cyclists
People from Manizales